Nova América/Del Castilho Station is a station on the Rio de Janeiro Metro that services the neighbourhood of Del Castilho in the North Zone of Rio de Janeiro. It is located near , a large shopping mall.

Construction
The station was opened in 1983 on the site of a former railway station Ferro Rio D’Ouro and used parts of the former structure.

Connections
MetrôRio runs buses to Fundão, Barra da Tijuca (Barra Expresso) and Jacarepaguá (Expresso Jacarepaguá) that depart from the station. Train connections to the Belford Roxo Line on the SuperVia rail network are available at the adjacent Del Castilho Station.

References

Metrô Rio stations
Railway stations opened in 1983
1983 establishments in Brazil